Perimeter 2: New Earth, stylized as Perimeter II: New Earth, is a sequel to the 2004 real-time strategy video game Perimeter, released in 2009.

Reception

Despite the commercial success of its predecessor, Perimeter 2 was not a big success.  The game received "generally unfavorable reviews" according to video game review aggregator Metacritic.

References

External links
 
 Perimeter 2: New Earth official site (archived, 2012)

2009 video games
1C Company games
Real-time strategy video games
Science fiction video games
Video game sequels
Video games developed in Russia
Windows games
Windows-only games
Strategy First games

Video games with voxel graphics